Uruguay competed at the 1968 Summer Olympics in Mexico City, Mexico. 27 competitors, 21 men and 6 women, took part in 31 events in 8 sports.

Athletics

Albertino Etchechury
Armando González
Josefa Vicent

Boxing

Mario Benítez
Juan Carlos Rivero
Carlos Alberto Casal
Nolberto Freitas

Cycling

Five cyclists represented Uruguay in 1968.

Team time trial
 Walter Garre
 Luis Sosa
 René Deceja
 Jorge Jukich

1000m time trial
 Luis Barruffa

Fencing

One fencer represented Uruguay in 1968.

Men's foil
Alberto Varela

Men's épée
 Alberto Varela

Rowing

Emilio Ahlers
José Ahlers
Luis Colman
Esteban Masseilot
José Sigot

Sailing

Fernando Thode

Shooting

Three shooters, all men, represented Uruguay in 1968.

50 m pistol
 Enrique Barragán
 Walter Vera

Trap
 Arturo Porro

Swimming

Ruth Apt Leheimer
Lylian Castillo
Emilia Figueroa
Ana María Norbis
Felicia Ospitaleche

References

External links
Montevideo.com
Official Olympic Reports

Nations at the 1968 Summer Olympics
1968
1968 in Uruguayan sport